This is a list of teachers of Vedanta, a Hindu philosophical system.

Pre-19th century
Vasishta Maharishi 
Shakti Maharishi 
Parashara Maharishi
Krishna Dwaipayana Vyasa
Sri Shuka Acharya
Badarayana
Gaudapada
Govinda Bhagavatpada
Adi Shankara Bhagavatpada
Sureśvara
Padmapāda
Hastamalakacharya
Totakacharya
Appayya Dikshitar
Vācaspati Miśra
Ramanujacharya
Vedanta Desika
Madhvacharya
Vidyaranya
Nimbarkacharya
Vishnuswami
Vallabhacharya
Caitanya Mahaprabhu
Dnyaneshwar
Vyasathirtha
Madhusudhana Saraswati
Nimbarka
Baladeva Vidyabhushana
Vijnanabhiksu
Srimanta Sankardeva
Mahadevendra Saraswathi V

19th-21st century
Bannanje Govindacharya
Ramakrishna Paramahamsa
Ramana Maharshi
Srila Prabhupada
Swami Vivekananda
Maharshi Dayananda Saraswati
Swami Sivananda Saraswati
Swami Satyananda Saraswati
Swami Chinmayananda Saraswati
Swami Dayananda Saraswati
Swami Ganapathi Sachchidananda
Swami Krishnananda
Swami Parthasarathy
Swami Rama Tirtha
Mannargudi Raju Sastri
Jayendra Saraswati
Nisargadatta Maharaj
Sacchidananda Shivabhinava Narasimha Bharathi
Chandrashekhara Bharati III 
Bharati Teertha Swamigal
Sri Vidhusekara Bharathi
Bhakti Hridaya Bon Swami
Bhakti Prajnana Kesava Goswami
Satchidananda Saraswati
Paramahansa Yogananda
Sacchidanandendra Saraswati
Swami Tejomayananda
Swami Ranganathananda, Ramakrishna Math and Ramakrishna Mission
 Atmananda Krishna Menon
Swami Chidaananda Puri
Acharya Prashant

See also
List of teachers of Advaita Vedanta

References

Vedanta Teachers
Teachers
Hinduism-related lists